Fábio Rosa (born 25 March 1972) is a former Argentine football player.

Rosa played for Grêmio FBPA and Botafogo-SP in the Campeonato Brasileiro.

External links
Profile at Globo Esporte's Futpedia

1972 births
Living people
Argentine footballers
Argentine expatriate sportspeople in Brazil
Expatriate footballers in Brazil
Footballers from Rosario, Santa Fe
Association football defenders
Grêmio Esportivo Glória players
Esporte Clube São José players
Grêmio Foot-Ball Porto Alegrense players
Botafogo Futebol Clube (SP) players
Mogi Mirim Esporte Clube players
Sociedade Esportiva do Gama players
Criciúma Esporte Clube players
Grêmio Foot-Ball Santanense players